Schroederia may refer to:
 Schroederia (alga), a genus of algae,
 Schroederia (bug), a genus of bugs in the tribe Mictini.

Genus disambiguation pages